In 1997–98 the Honduran Liga Nacional brought a new competition system; the league would be now divided into two tournaments (Apertura and Clausura), having C.D. Motagua won their 6th and 7th title in this new format. The tournament lasted from August 1997 to October 1998 and it consisted of 11 teams for the first time since the 1981–82 season.  The final match was played in the evening of 25 October, just a few hours before Hurricane Mitch landed in the coasts of Honduras.

1997–98 teams

 Independiente Villela (invited)
 Marathón
 Motagua
 Olimpia
 Palestino (promoted)
 Platense
 Real España
 Real Maya
 Universidad
 Victoria
 Vida

Apertura

Regular season
 Also serves as 1997 Honduran Cup.

Standings

Results

Final round

Hexagonal

 Olimpia won 4–2 on aggregate.

 Motagua 1–1 Real España on aggregate. Motagua advanced on better Regular season record; Real España advanced as best loser.

 Platense 1–1 Universidad on aggregate; Platense advanced on better Regular season record.

Semifinals

 Real España won 3–1 on aggregate.

 Motagua 2–2 Olimpia on aggregate; Motagua advanced on better Regular season record.

Final

 Motagua won 5–1 on aggregate.

Top goalscorers
19 goals
  Wilmer Velásquez (Olimpia)
11 goals
  Juan Manuel Cárcamo (Platense)
7 goals

  Denilson Costa (Olimpia)
  Francisco Ramírez (Motagua)
  Marlon Hernández (Motagua)

6 goals

  Amado Guevara (Motagua)
  Alex Pineda Chacón (Olimpia)

5 goals

  Alexis Duarte (Marathón)
  Jairo Martínez (Motagua)
  Edwin Castro (Marathón)

Clausura

Regular season

Standings

Results

Final round

Hexagonal

 Olimpia 2–2 Victoria on aggregate; Olimpia advances on better performance in Regular season; Victoria advances as best loser.

 Platense 1–1 Marathón on aggregate; Platense advances on better performance in Regular season.

 Motagua won 5–2 on aggregate.

Semifinals

 Olimpia 2–2 Victoria on aggregate; Olimpia advances on better performance in Regular season.

 Motagua won 5–4 on aggregate.

Final

 Motagua won 1–0 on aggregate.

Top goalscorers
15 goals

  Wilmer Velásquez (Olimpia)
  Amado Guevara (Motagua)

13 goals
  Denilson Costa (Olimpia)
8 goals
  Juan Manuel Cárcamo (Platense)
7 goals

  Marlon Hernández (Olimpia)
  Francisco Ramírez (Marathón)
  Rodinei Martins (Olimpia)
  Toninho (Marathón)

5 goals

  Alejandro Naíf (Victoria)
  Marvin Brown (Vida)
  Luis Ramírez (Independiente Villela)

2 goals

  Carlos Salinas (Motagua)
  Fabricio Pérez (Marathón)

1 goal

  Alexander Díaz (Real España)
  Enrique Reneau (Marathón)

Relegation table

Squads

Curiosities
On 12 July 1998, the league scheduled a match between Palestino F.C. and Universidad at Estadio Miraflores.  The game which started at 14:00 local time, was played at the same time of the 1998 FIFA World Cup Final between France and Brazil.  The match which ended 2–0 to Palestino, was witnessed by 55 loyal fans, an outstanding record.

References

1
Honduras
Liga Nacional de Fútbol Profesional de Honduras seasons